
Gmina Jaśliska is a rural gmina (administrative district) in Krosno County, Subcarpathian Voivodeship, in south-eastern Poland, on the Slovak border. Its seat is the village of Jaśliska.

Gmina Jaśliska was created as of 1 January 2010, out of part of Gmina Dukla. (Jaśliska was previously the seat of a gmina between 1934 and 1954, and between 1973 and 1976.)

Villages
Gmina Jaśliska contains the sołectwos of Daliowa, Jaśliska, Posada Jaśliska, Szklary and Wola Niżna. Places in the gmina not having sołectwo status include Czeremcha, Lipowiec and Wola Wyżna.

Neighbouring gminas
Gmina Jaśliska is bordered by the gminas of Dukla, Komańcza and Rymanów. It also borders Slovakia.

Jasliska
Krosno County
States and territories established in 2010